Contractualism is a term in philosophy which refers either to a family of political theories in the social contract tradition (when used in this sense, the term is an umbrella term for all social contract theories that include contractarianism), or to the ethical theory developed in recent years by T. M. Scanlon, especially in his book What We Owe to Each Other (published 1998).

Social contract theorists from the history of political thought include Hugo Grotius (1625), Thomas Hobbes (1651), Samuel Pufendorf (1673), John Locke (1689), Jean-Jacques Rousseau (1762), and Immanuel Kant (1797); more recently, John Rawls (1971), David Gauthier (1986) and Philip Pettit (1997).

References

Further reading
 Ashford, Elizabeth and Mulgan, Tim. 2007. 'Contractualism'. In Edward N. Zalta (ed.), Stanford Encyclopedia of Philosophy (accessed October 2007).
 Cudd, Ann. 2007. 'Contractarianism'. In Edward N. Zalta (ed.), The Stanford Encyclopedia of Philosophy. (Summer 2007 Edition).
 Scanlon, T. M. 1998. What We Owe to Each Other. Cambridge, Massachusetts
 Scanlon, T. M. 2003. The Difficulty of Tolerance: Essays in Political Philosophy. Cambridge University Press

Normative ethics
Meta-ethics
Social theories